Besterberg: The Best of Paul Westerberg is a compilation album of recordings by Paul Westerberg.

Included are singles, two out-takes from Eventually, B-sides and soundtrack contributions.

Track listing
All songs by Paul Westerberg except otherwise noted.

"Dyslexic Heart" – 4:31
"Knockin' on Mine" – 3:45
"World Class Fad" – 3:31
"Runaway Wind" – 4:26
"Things" – 3:22
"Seein' Her" – 2:59
"Man Without Ties" – 3:28
"A Star Is Bored" – 3:55
"Stain Yer Blood" – 3:02
"Love Untold" – 4:18
"Once Around the Weekend" – 4:06
"Angels Walk" – 3:30
"It's a Wonderful Lie" –  2:49
"Lookin' Out Forever" – 3:43
"Nowhere Man" (Lennon–McCartney) – 3:30
"High Time" – 3:02
"Let the Bad Times Roll" – 3:45
"What a Day (For a Night)" – 3:15
"All That I Had" – 4:27
"C'mon, C'mon, C'mon" – 2:43

Personnel 

Matthew Abels – project assistant
Kenny Aronoff – drums
Kim Biggs – art direction, design
Michael Bland – percussion
Kristin Callahan – photography
Charmony Brothers – backing vocals
Keith Christopher – bass
Reggie Collins – discographical annotation
Luther Covington – guitar
Sheryl Farber – editorial supervision
Josh Freese – percussion, drums
Lou Giordano – producer
Dan Hersch – remastering
Darren Hill – compilation producer
Bill Inglot – remastering
Suzie Katayama – accordion, cello
Dennis Keeley – cover photo
Josh Kelly – drums, backing vocals
Scott Litt – producer
Brian MacLeod – drums
Hayley Madden – Photography
Kenny Nemes – project assistant
Brendan O'Brien – acoustic guitar, bass, guitar, keyboards, producer
Frank Okenfels – photography
Randy Perry – project assistant
John Pierce – bass
Zeke Pine – bass
Ron Pownall – photography
Rick Price – bass, mandolin, backing vocals
Elrod Puce – maracas, triangle, backing vocals, handclapping
Glenn Schwartz – project assistant
Jim Steinfeldt – photography
Benmont Tench – keyboards
Miranda Penn Turin – photography
Henry Twiddle – drums
Michael Urbano – percussion, drums
Becky Wagner – project assistant
Matt Wallace – percussion, vocals (background), producer
Don Was – bass, producer, acoustic bass
Tanya Welsch – project assistant
Paul Westerberg – acoustic guitar, bass, guitar, piano, drums, keyboards, vocals, backing vocals, melodica, producer, slide guitar, compilation producer, instrumentation
Mason Williams – compilation producer

References

Paul Westerberg albums
Rhino Records compilation albums
2005 greatest hits albums
Albums produced by Paul Westerberg
Albums produced by Matt Wallace
Albums produced by Lou Giordano
Albums produced by Brendan O'Brien (record producer)
Albums produced by Scott Litt
Albums produced by Don Was